The 2006 Myanmar Premier League season saw 16 teams in competition. Finance and Revenue FC won the championship.

Results

See also
2000 Myanmar Premier League
2003 Myanmar Premier League
2004 Myanmar Premier League
2005 Myanmar Premier League
2007 Myanmar Premier League
2008 Myanmar Premier League

References
http://www.aajfm.com

Myanmar Premier League seasons
Burma
Burma
1